Cholecystokinin receptors or CCK receptors are a group of G-protein coupled receptors which bind the peptide hormones cholecystokinin (CCK) and gastrin. There are two different subtypes CCKA and CCKB which are ~50% homologous: Various cholecystokinin antagonists have been developed and are used in research, although the only drug of this class that has been widely marketed to date is the anti-ulcer drug proglumide.

References

External links 
 

G protein-coupled receptors